The 2010 Barclays New York Challenge was an exhibition international club football (soccer) competition which  featured football club teams from Europe and North America, and was held in July 2010. All matches were played in Red Bull Arena in Harrison, New Jersey in the United States. The tournament is part of the World Series of Soccer. Sporting CP emerged as the 2010 Barclays New York Challenge winners. Robbie Keane was named the Barclays Player of the Tournament with two goals and one assist.

Teams 
The following four clubs participated in the 2010 tournament:

 New York Red Bulls from Major League Soccer.
 Tottenham Hotspur from the Premier League.
 Manchester City from the Premier League.
 Sporting CP from the Portuguese Liga.

Sponsors 

Voss
Barclays

Stadium 
The newly built Red Bull Arena hosted all four games. Owned by Red Bull GmbH, the stadium has 25,189 seats. The record attendance was during a match between the Red Bulls and Brazilian club Santos FC in March 2010 with 25,000.

Players 

Manchester City's newest signing Yaya Touré made his club debut against Sporting while Thierry Henry of the New York Red Bulls also made his club debut against Tottenham Hotspur. Henry scored his first ever goal for New York from a cross by Joel Lindpere.

Other notable players in the tournament included Roman Pavlyuchenko, Robbie Keane, Maniche, Patrick Vieira and Matías Fernández.

Rules
Clubs received one point for each goal scored in regulation. Clubs earned three points for a win. Total goals scored was the first tiebreaker, than fewest goals conceded, then fastest goal scored. The team with the highest overall number of points determined the 2010 Barclays New York Challenge winner.

Matches
The schedule for the tournament.

Day 1

Day 2

Day 3

Standings

Statistical leaders

Top scorers

Top assists

References

External links
 Official sponsor website 

American soccer friendly trophies